The Living is American author Annie Dillard's first novel, a historical fiction account of European settlers and a group of Lummi natives in late 19th century Washington published in 1992. The main action of the book takes place in the Puget Sound settlements of Whatcom, Old Bellingham, Sehome, and Fairhaven, which would later merge to form the city of Bellingham, Washington.

As research for the novel, Dillard lived for five years in the Bellingham area, much of that time in 19th century era accommodations.

Footnotes

Historical novels
1992 novels
Novels set in Washington (state)
Bellingham, Washington
HarperCollins books
Novels set in the 19th century
1992 debut novels